This is a list of leaders of the Islamic State since the establishment of the Islamic State of Iraq.

List of leaders

Emirs of the Islamic State of Iraq

Caliphs of the Islamic State

Leaders of the international branches of the Islamic State 

List of known Leaders of the international branches of the Islamic State part of the worldwide caliphate.

Boko Haram as part of ISIL 

 Abubakar Shekau (2015–2016)

Islamic State – Caucasus Province 

 Rustam Asildarov (23 June 2015 – 3 December 2016)

Islamic State in the Greater Sahara 

 Adnan Abu Walid al-Sahrawi (13 May 2015 – 2019)
 Abdoul Hakim al-Sahrawi (2019 (Possible) – present)

Islamic State – Khorasan Province 
 Hafiz Saeed Khan(2015 – July 2016)
 Abdul Haseeb Logari (2016 – April 2017)
 Abdul Rahman Ghaleb (April – July 2017)
 Abu Saad Erhabi (July 2017 – August 2018)
 Ziya ul-Haq  (August 2018 – April 2019)
 Abdullah Orokzai   (April 2019 – April 2020)
 Shahab al-Muhajir (April 2020 – present)

Islamic State in Libya 

 Abu Nabil al-Anbari (13 November 2014 – 13 November 2015) 
 Abdul Qader al-Najdi (March 2016 – present) (possible death in September 2020)

Islamic State in Somalia 

 Abdul Qadir Mumin (22 October 2015 – present)

Islamic State – West Africa Province 

 Abubakar Shekau (2015 – 2016) – deposed for being too radical
 Abu Musab al-Barnawi (2016 – 2019) – deposed and demoted without explanation
 Abu Abdullahi Umar Al Barnawi "Ba Idrisa" (2019 – 2020) – purged and reportedly killed after some of his followers opposed his deposition
 Lawan Abubakar "Ba Lawan" / "Abba Gana" (2020 – 2021)

Claimed leaders by media and officials 

 Lawan Abubakar (July – August 2021)
 "Abu Dawud" / "Aba Ibrahim" (from August 2021)
 Malam Bako or Abu Musab al-Barnawi ( October 2021)
 Sani Shuwaram (from November 2021)

Islamic State – Yemen Province 

 Abu Bilal al-Harbi (c. 2014 – March 2017 (or earlier))
 Abu Osama al-Muhajir (March 2017 – 25 June 2019)

References 

Islamic State of Iraq and the Levant
Islamic State of Iraq and the Levant activities
Terrorism-related lists
Lists of criminals
Islamic State of Iraq and the Levant members